Chaganovo is a rural locality (a village) in Rozhdestvenskoye Rural Settlement, Sobinsky District, Vladimir Oblast, Russia. The population was 10 as of 2010. There are 3 streets.

Geography 
Chaganovo is located on the Koloksha River, 37 km north of Sobinka (the district's administrative centre) by road. Meshchera is the nearest rural locality.

References 

Rural localities in Sobinsky District
Vladimirsky Uyezd